Loobia polo is an Iranian dish of rice, green beans, and beef or lamb. In the Persian language, loobia means bean while polo is a style of cooked rice, known in English as pilaf. It is made by sautéing onion with a touch of turmeric powder followed by mixing the beef, then adding the cooked green beans with salt and pepper. You can always add cinnamon for an extra sense of flavor. This is then layered with half-cooked rice in another pot and steamed until done.

Loobia polo can also be made by using chicken or lamb instead of beef, and by using rice cooked in the kateh style.

See also
 List of rice dishes
 Iranian cuisine
 Pilaf

References

Rice dishes
Iranian cuisine
Persian words and phrases